The Centre for the History of Science, Technology and Medicine (CHoSTM) is an academic department of King's College London which teaches and researches the History of Science.

History 
Originally, it was one of Imperial College London's three departments forming the London Centre for the History of Science, Medicine, and Technology. CHoSTM's offices were located in the Central Library at Imperial College's South Kensington Campus in London, United Kingdom.

CHoSTM was formed in 1992 and subsequently merged with the Humanities Programme in 2007, although the subject had been taught by the college since 1963. It was the highest rated UK history department in the 2008 Research Assessment Exercise.

Move to King's College London 
At the end of 2012 King's College London announced that the Centre would become part of their campus.

See also
Imperial College London
King's College London
London Centre for the History of Science, Medicine, and Technology
Department of Science and Technology Studies, University College London

References

External links
CHoSTM website

Educational institutions established in 1992
History of Imperial College London
Departments of King's College London
History of science and technology in England
1992 establishments in England